Kummerow is a village and a former municipality in the Vorpommern-Rügen district, in Mecklenburg-Vorpommern, Germany. Since May 2019, it is part of the municipality of Niepars.

References

Former municipalities in Mecklenburg-Western Pomerania